Roger Sessions' Violin Concerto was composed between 1927 and 1935, and is scored for violin and orchestra (without violins).

History
The violin concerto was begun, at the suggestion of Serge Koussevitzky, in the summer of 1927—although the composer later postdated the beginning of this work to his years at the American Academy in Rome in 1928 and 1929,—and was completed in 1935. It was originally meant to have been premiered by the Boston Symphony Orchestra during their 1932–33 season, with Richard Burgin as soloist, but Sessions did not finish the finale—originally to have been the third movement—in time. Ultimately deciding on a four-movement form, Sessions delivered the violin part to Burgin in the fall of 1934, while still orchestrating the last movement, and Koussevitzky agreed to program the concerto during the first half of the 1935–36 season. When Sessions expressed a preference for a better-known violinist, Burgin graciously stepped aside and Joseph Szigeti was named as the probable soloist.

The Concerto was finally completed in San Francisco in August 1935, and the premiere was scheduled to take place in November 1936, but the now-intended soloist, Albert Spalding, asked for a postponement and requested that Sessions compose a new finale. Sessions declined and released the violinist of his obligation to perform the concerto. Spalding could not master the violin part, especially the "punishingly fast" tarantella finale, and the performance was cancelled at the last minute. The concerto was finally given its first performance with a professional orchestra by Louis Krasner and the Minneapolis Symphony Orchestra, conducted by Dimitri Mitropoulos, on November 14, 1947, though an earlier performance had been given in Chicago on January 8, 1940, by Robert Arthur Gross, the WPA Illinois Symphony Orchestra, and Izler Solomon, and Gross also performed the first two movements in 1941 with the National Youth Orchestra under Leopold Stokowski.

It is dedicated to Sessions' first wife, Barbara.

The concerto's advocates have included Tossy Spivakovsky (who gave the New York premiere with Leonard Bernstein conducting in 1959); more recently, it has been performed in 1968 by David Schneider with Josef Krips conducting, and Ole Bøhn, who has made the work's second recording.

Style and form
Sessions regarded his concerto as a pronounced move away from his previous neoclassical style. It marks the beginning of his characteristic, unique style featuring extended, continuously flowing sections in which ideas surface, gain clarity and definition, and then recede again into the general flow. It is in four movements:
Largo e tranquillo, con grande espressione (ca. 9–11 minutes)
Scherzo (Allegro) (ca. 6–8 minutes)
Romanza (Andante) (ca. 4 minutes)
Molto vivace e sempre con fuoco (ca. 10–11 minutes)

The first movement opens with two motifs, a rising diatonic segment in the trombone consisting of the first five notes of the B minor scale, and a more intense, jagged line in the trumpet, in a rapidly rising and falling pattern covering a diminished eleventh. These two figures occur throughout the entire concerto, and serve to unify the whole. The third movement is joined to the finale by a cadenza for the soloist, which employs a sort of metric modulation in which the violin accelerates through a measure of thirty-seconds to a bridge passage of sextuplet thirty-seconds, entering the finale with a passage equivalent in basic pulse though not in speed with the previous movement.

Recordings
Paul Zukofsky, violin; ORTF Orchestra, Gunther Schuller, conductor. CRI Recordings (CRI 220 USD LP, 1968, and CD 676, 1994.)
Ole Bøhn, violin; Monadnock Festival Orchestra (Peterborough, New Hampshire), James Bolle, conductor. Albany Records ALB 938, 2007.
Rolf Schulte, violin; Nordwestdeutsche Philharmonie, János Kulka conductor. Rolf Schulte / RSR (191061080589) [Download only]

Notes and references
Notes

References

Sources

 
 
  Reprinted as "Roger Sessions: Violin Concerto (1959)", in Elliott Carter: Collected Essays and Lectures, 1937–1995, edited by Jonathan W. Bernard, 175–180 (Rochester, New York: University of Rochester Press, 1997). .
 
 
 
   (hardback);  (pbk.);  (ebook).

Further reading
 Imbrie, Andrew. 1962. "Roger Sessions: In Honor of His Sixty-Fifth Birthday". Perspectives of New Music 1, no. 1 (Autumn): 117–147.
 Prausnitz, Frederik. 2002. Roger Sessions: How a "Difficult" Composer Got That Way. Oxford and New York: Oxford University Press. .
 Sessions, Roger. 1992. The Correspondence of Roger Sessions, edited by Andrea Olmstead. Boston: Northeastern University Press. 

Sessions
Compositions by Roger Sessions
1935 compositions